Yuko Kishida (Kishida Yuko;  Wada; born 15 August 1964) is the spouse of the Prime Minister of Japan since 2021 as the wife of Fumio Kishida.

Biography

Kishida was born in Miyoshi City, Hiroshima Prefecture, as the eldest daughter of a real estate company owner. She attended Hiroshima Jogakuin Junior and Senior High School, an integrated junior and senior high school. After graduating from high school, she attended Tokyo Women's Christian University. She has three sons with her husband Fumio Kishida.

On 4 October 2021, her husband became Prime Minister of Japan after winning the 2021 Liberal Democratic Party (Japan) leadership election.

References

External links
 

1964 births
Living people
Spouses of prime ministers of Japan
People from Hiroshima Prefecture
Tokyo Woman's Christian University alumni